The Cornell Potential is an effective method to account for the confinement of quarks. It was developed

in the 1970s to explain the masses of quarkonium states and account for the relation between the mass and angular momentum of the hadron (the so-called Regge trajectories). The potential has the form:

where  is the effective radius of the quarkonium state,  is the QCD running coupling,  is the QCD string tension and  GeV is a constant. Initially,  and  where merely empirical parameters but with the development of QCD can now be calculated using perturbative QCD and Lattice QCD, respectively.

Short distance potential

The potential consists of two parts. The first one,  dominate at short distances, typically for  fm. It arises from the one-gluon exchange between the quark and its anti-quark, and is known as the Coulombic part of the potential, since it has the same form as the well-known Coulombic potential  induced by the electromagnetic force (where  is the electromagnetic coupling constant).

The factor  in QCD comes from the fact that quarks have different type of charges (colors) and is associated with any gluon emission from a quark.

The value for  depends on the radius of the studied hadron. Its value ranges from 0.19 to 0.4. 
For precise determination of the short distance potential, the running of  must be accounted for, resulting in a distant-dependent . Specifically,  must be calculated in the so-called potential renormalization scheme (also denoted V-scheme) and, since quantum field theory calculations are usually done in momentum space, Fourier transformed to position space.

Long distance potential

The second term of the potential, is the linear confinement term and fold-in the non-perturbative QCD effects that result in color confinement.  is interpreted as the tension of the QCD string that forms when the gluonic field lines collapse into a flux tube. Its value is  GeV. 
 controls the intercepts and slopes of the linear Regge trajectories.

Domains of application

The Cornell potential applies best for the case of static quarks (or very heavy quarks with non-relativistic motion), although relativistic improvements to the potential using speed-dependent terms are available. Likewise, the potential has been extended to include spin-dependent terms

Calculation of the quark-quark potential
A test of validity for approaches that seek to explain color confinement is that they must produce, in the limit that quark motions are non-relativistic, a potential that agrees with the Cornell potential.

A significant achievement of Lattice QCD is to be able compute from first principles the static quark-antiquark potential, with results confirming the empirical Cornell Potential.

Other approaches to the confinement problem also results in the Cornell potential, including the Dual superconductor model, the Abelian Higgs model, the Center vortex models.

More recently, calculations based on the AdS/CFT correspondence have reproduced the Cornell potential using the AdS/QCD correspondence
or Light front holography.

See also
Color confinement
QCD vacuum

References 

Quantum chromodynamics
 
Mesons